SmartEiffel is a free Eiffel compiler. The compiler translates Eiffel code either to C or Java bytecode. Hence it can be used to write programs that run on virtually any platform for which an ANSI C compiler or a Java virtual machine exist.

SmartEiffel has been developed at the Lorraine Laboratory of Research in Information Technology and its Applications (LORIA), an institute affiliated to the French National Institute for Research in Computer Science and Control (INRIA), on the campus of Nancy-Université in Lorraine.

The project was initiated in 1994 by the French researcher Dominique Colnet. The compiler was then called SmallEiffel, in reference to the Smalltalk language. In 1995, the compiler was able to compile itself for the first time. In 1998, on the occasion of a visit to LORIA by Richard Stallman, the project became part of the GNU Project. In December 2002, the project was renamed SmartEiffel and reached version 1.0. In September 2004, SmartEiffel reached version 2.0.

In May 2005, after divergences with the working group for the normalization of the Eiffel language, the SmartEiffel project announced that they would not implement the ECMA TC39-TG4 norm.

See also

LibertyEiffel, the successor project and new GNU Eiffel project

External links
The Grand SmartEiffel Book – official wiki
  Efficient Dynamic Dispatch without Virtual Function Tables:  The SmallEiffel Compiler ; Olivier ZENDRA, Dominique COLNET and Suzanne COLLINE ; 1997 ; Centre de Recherche en Informatique de Nancy Campus Scientifique, Bâtiment LORIA

Compilers
Free compilers and interpreters